Hugo Torres (born Córdoba, 24 April 1962) is a former Argentinian rugby union player and coach.

Career
Torres started his career in 1979, playing for his hometown club, Tala Rugby Club until 1987, when he moved to Italy playing for CUS Roma Rugby in the 1987-88 season, then for Rugby Roma Olimpic between 1988 and 1995. From 1995, he returned to CUS Roma Rugby, where he started as player-coach, between 1998 and 2001 he moved to Unione Rugby Capitolina and then, for Castel San Pietro, being player-coach in both clubs. Torres retired in the 2003 season.
Torres was called in the Argentina national rugby union team during the 1987 Rugby World Cup, but never saw action.

Notes

External links

1962 births
Living people
Argentine rugby union coaches
Argentine rugby union players
Rugby union props
Rugby union coaches
Sportspeople from Córdoba, Argentina